Scope or scopes may refer to:

People with the surname
 Jamie Scope (born 1986), English footballer
 John T. Scopes (1900–1970), central figure in the Scopes Trial regarding the teaching of evolution

Arts, media, and entertainment
 CinemaScope or Scope prints, anamorphic film prints
 Scope (magazine), a South African men's magazine
 The Scope (alternative weekly), a newspaper in St. John's, Newfoundland
 Scope (Australian TV series)
 Scope (Irish TV series)
 Scope (album), a 1979 studio album by Buck Hill Quartet

Computing
 Scope (computer science), the range in which a variable can be referenced
 scope (scopeArchiv), an archival information program
 CDC SCOPE, a series of Control Data Corporation operating systems

Concepts
 Scope (logic), the range influenced by the quantification in logic
 Scope (formal semantics), the natural language counterpart of logical scope
 Scope (project management), the sum of all projects, products and their features
 Scope of practice (US and Canada), terminology that defines the procedures, actions, and processes that are permitted for licensed professionals

Devices and procedures
 Any of a number of viewing instruments
 SCOPE (protein engineering), a technique of creating gene libraries
 Scope (synthesizer), a DSP-based synthesizer by Creamware
 Endoscope, an optical instrument (borescope) used to perform medical visual inspection (endoscopy) of enclosed body cavities. The term "scope" may refer to the following medical procedures:
 Arthroscopy, for examining a joint space (orthopedics)
 Bronchoscopy, for examining the lower respiratory tract (pulmonology)
 Colonoscopy, for examining the large intestine (gastroenterology)
 Cystoscopy, for examining the bladder (urology)
 Gastroscopy, for examining the esophagus, stomach and duodenum (gastroenterology)
 Mediastinoscopy, for examining the anterior mediastinum (cardiothoracics)
 Laparoscopy, for examining the abdominopelvic cavity (general surgery and gynecology)
 Nephroscopy, for examining the pelvic and calyceal system of a kidney (urology)
 Rhinoscopy, for examining the nasal cavity, sinuses and pharynx (otorhinolaryngology)
 Thoracoscopy, for examining a pleural cavity (cardiothoracics)
 Ureteroscopy, for examining a ureter (urology)
 Microscope, a magnifying optical instrument used to see objects that are too small for the naked eye
 Oscilloscope, a type of electronic test instrument
 Scope soldering iron, an Australian low-voltage soldering iron
 Telescope, a magnifying optical instrument used to see objects that are too distant for the naked eye
 Spotting scope, a portable high-power telescope for observation of distant objects
 Telescopic sight, a telescope used as a sighting device, typically on rifles and air rifles

Organisations
 Scope (charity), a British charity that supports people with disabilities
 SCOPE Art Show, a global emerging art fair
 SCOPE Maastricht, a nonprofit study association at Maastricht University, The Netherlands
 Scientific Committee on Problems of the Environment
 Senior Consulting Program for Engineering, a program at Olin College in Massachusetts

Other uses
 Scope (horse), a racehorse
 Scope (mouthwash)
 Norfolk Scope, an arena in Norfolk, Virginia

See also
 Scope creep, the incremental expansion of the scope of a project
 Scopus (disambiguation)